Hedong Subdistrict is a subdistrict of Haigang District, in the eastern part of Qinhuangdao, Hebei, People's Republic of China. , it has seven residential communities under its administration.

See also
List of township-level divisions of Hebei

References

Township-level divisions of Hebei
Qinhuangdao